Tropics and Meridians is the second studio album by Louisville-based math rock band June of 44, released on June 18, 1996 by Quarterstick Records.

Track listing

Personnel
Adapted from the Tropics and Meridians liner notes.

June of 44
 Fred Erskine – bass guitar
 Sean Meadows – electric guitar, vocals
 Jeff Mueller – electric guitar, vocals
 Doug Scharin – drums

Production and additional personnel
 Bob Weston – production, recording, mixing

Release history

References

External links 
 

1996 albums
June of 44 albums
Quarterstick Records albums
Albums produced by Bob Weston